Christopher Scott Dohmann (born February 13, 1978) is an American former baseball pitcher. Dohmann graduated from St. Thomas More High School (LA) where he was a member of two district champion teams. He attended the University of Louisiana at Lafayette where he pitched in the  College World Series.

Professional career

Colorado Rockies
Dohmann was drafted by the Colorado Rockies in the sixth round of the 2000 MLB draft. He made his major league debut on May 15, 2004, against the Philadelphia Phillies, allowing two runs in two innings of work. He pitched in 41 games for the Rockies in 2004, 32 in 2005 and 27 in 2006.

Kansas City Royals
On July 31, 2006, he and Ryan Shealy were traded from the Rockies to the Kansas City Royals for Jeremy Affeldt and Denny Bautista. He appeared in 21 games for the Royals, finishing 1–3 with a 7.99 ERA.

Tampa Bay Devil Rays/Tampa Bay Rays
On January 22, the Tampa Bay Devil Rays signed him as a free agent. He was in 31 games with the Devil Rays in 2007, finishing 3–0 with a 3.31 ERA and in 2008 he was 2–0 with a 6.14 ERA in 12 games with the Rays.

Hiroshima Toyo Carp
On October 15, the Rays granted free agency to Dohmann and he signed with the Hiroshima Toyo Carp on December 17, 2008.

Arizona Diamondbacks
In June 2009 Dohmann was released by the Japanese team and signed a minor league contract with the Arizona Diamondbacks  where he spent the remainder of the season with the Reno Aces of the Pacific Coast League. He was 0–1 with a 6.75 ERA in 14 appearances for the Aces.

Los Angeles Dodgers
On January 11, 2010, Dohmann signed a minor league contract with the Los Angeles Dodgers with an invite to spring training. He was assigned to the Triple-A Albuquerque Isotopes. In 47 games with the Isotopes, he was 1–2 with a 5.82 ERA and 16 saves.

References

External links

Scott Dohmann Fansite
Baseball Almanac Scott Dohmann Page

1978 births
Living people
Baseball players from New Orleans
University of Louisiana at Lafayette alumni
Louisiana Ragin' Cajuns baseball players
Colorado Rockies players
Kansas City Royals players
Tampa Bay Devil Rays players
Tampa Bay Rays players
Major League Baseball pitchers
Portland Rockies players
Asheville Tourists players
Salem Avalanche players
Tulsa Drillers players
Colorado Springs Sky Sox players
Modesto Nuts players
Durham Bulls players
Hiroshima Toyo Carp players
Reno Aces players
Albuquerque Isotopes players
American expatriate baseball players in Japan